Colin Stafford-Johnson is an Irish wildlife cameraman, filmmaker and television presenter, best known for his work on a variety of BBC nature documentaries.

Early life and education
Stafford-Johnson was born brought up in Cabinteely, Dublin, Ireland. His family had a garden centre and nursery business there. His father, Barney Johnson, was the first TV gardener in Ireland. He left Dublin when he was about 20 and lived in the UK, and then overseas for years, traveling around the world.

He attended the University of Derby, completing a degree in Biology, mixed with training to be a wildlife cameraman.

Career
Stafford-Johnson has worked on filming several productions for RTÉ and the BBC, winning several awards for his work. He specialised in filming big cats and worked as a cameraman on the landmark BBC series Planet Earth.

He has filmed and presented several episodes of BBC's long running Natural World series. In 2011 he presented the episode "A Tiger Called Broken Tail", and the following year he presented "Queen of the Tigers." 2013 saw him present "Meet the Monkeys." In 2015 he narrated "Ireland’s Wild River: The Mighty Shannon" about the River Shannon.

In 2020 he presented a two-part wildlife programme titled "Wild Cuba: A Caribbean Journey".

Along with his work on Natural World, Stafford-Johnson has co-presented Wild UK and presented "Wild Ireland: Edge of the World" in 2017. In 2019 he presented "Animal Babies: First year on Earth".

In 2021, he returned to his home in Ireland to create a wild garden, a series filmed for the BBC as The Wild Gardener.

References

Irish filmmakers
Living people
People from Dún Laoghaire–Rathdown
Year of birth missing (living people)